The 2006 Korean FA Cup, known as the 2006 Hana Bank FA Cup, was the eleventh edition of the Korean FA Cup.

Qualifying round

First round

Final rounds

Bracket

Round of 32

Round of 16

Quarter-finals

Semi-finals

Final

Awards
Source:

See also
2006 in South Korean football
2006 K League
2006 Korea National League
2006 Korean League Cup

References

External links
Official website
Official Fixtures & Results at KFA

2006
2006 domestic association football cups
2006 in South Korean football